Dzhambulad Vasilyevich Bazayev (born 18 August 1979) is a retired Russian Ossetian footballer who played as a midfielder.

External links
 Russian First Division Squads 2008
 Profile 

1979 births
Living people
People from Rustavi
Ossetian people
Ossetian footballers
Russian footballers
Russia under-21 international footballers
Association football midfielders
FC Spartak Vladikavkaz players
FC Zenit Saint Petersburg players
FC Saturn Ramenskoye players
FC Rubin Kazan players
Russian Premier League players